Sülüklü is a village in the Şehitkamil District, Gaziantep Province, Turkey. The village is inhabited by Turkmens of the Qiziq tribe and had a population of 584 in 2021.

References

Villages in Şehitkamil District